Champart was a tax in Medieval France levied by landowners on tenants. Paid as a share of the harvest, the amount due varied between 

Regional names for champart included 

Beginning in the early modern period, champart was converted into a cash rent, first in the Île-de-France region.

References
 Fossier, Robert, "Cens" in Gauvard, C., de Libera, A. & Zink, M. (eds), Dictionnaire du Moyen Âge. Paris: PUF/Quadrige, 2nd edn, 2004. 

Ancien Régime
Taxation in France